There are a number of notable sources of media in Binghamton, New York.  Located near the border with Pennsylvania, Binghamton media act as a source of information and entertainment for a large region, extending well beyond the metropolitan area.  Most local television and radio stations broadcast from Ingraham Hill, which is located in the town of Binghamton, just south of the city.

Television stations
According to the Nielsen Company, Binghamton is the 159th largest TV market in the United States.

There are also two local cable stations in Binghamton, both carried by Charter Communications (doing business as Charter Spectrum). Spectrum News Central New York broadcasts 24-hour local cable news programming, and Spectrum Sports provides regional sports programming.  Both channels originate from Syracuse, but maintain distinct feeds for the Binghamton market. Binghamton falls under the regional broadcasting market of the YES Network, MSG, and SportsNet New York.

Radio stations
As of 2021, Nielsen ranks Binghamton as the United States' 194th largest radio market.

FM
FM stations with transmitters located within  of Binghamton (excluding translators that simulcast other FM stations within the radius):

AM
AM stations with transmitters located within  of Binghamton:

Print
Currently, Binghamton is home to a single regional daily newspaper, the Press & Sun-Bulletin.  There are, however, a number of community newspapers produced regionally.

Commercial
 Greater Binghamton Business Journal (weekly)
 Press & Sun-Bulletin (daily)
 Southern Tier Business News (monthly)

Non-commercial
 The Bridge (Independent Media Center affiliate, online)
 Binghamton Review (Binghamton University student newspaper, biweekly)
 Pipe Dream (Binghamton University student newspaper, twice weekly)
 Triple Cities Carousel (arts news, monthly)
 What's Goin' On Binghamton (arts, entertainment, weekly, online)

Binghamton in popular media

 Night Gallery – Rod Serling's home address in Binghamton was used in the episode "They're Tearing Down Tim Riley's Bar."  Serling was famously fond of the city and based the Twilight Zone episode "Walking Distance" on the carousel near his childhood home. A plaque placed in the ground near the carousel commemorates this and there is a plaque commemorating Serling in front of the Binghamton High School on Main Street. In the "Twilight Zone" episode "Mirror Image," Paul Grinstead is from Binghamton (https://m.imdb.com/title/tt0734590/; episode watched and confirmed by editor).
 The song "Ragged Old Flag" was written by Johnny Cash when he was in Binghamton for a concert in 1974. The song references a flag in the courthouse square, which was likely inspired by the Broome County Courthouse square.
 Liebestraum – This motion picture was filmed in many locations in and around Binghamton, in particular utilizing the Perry Block, a building with a cast-iron facade. Binghamton has one of the last remaining examples of such architecture downtown.
 Inside Deep Throat
 Death Wish 3 - Paul Kersey's girlfriend's sister is from Binghamton.
 Rounders - A poker game is played here, not filmed here.
 Mystery Alaska - At the end of the movie,  a character says, "I'm not going to the New York Rangers right away. They're sending me to Binghamton, which is like the AHL."
The Sopranos – In season six, Christopher Moltisanti's mistress is from Binghamton.
X-Files – In season 2 episode "Colony", Mulder and Scully briefly track a killer through Binghamton, stopping at the fictional Globe and Mail local newspaper office. In season 9, Monica Reyes' new Georgetown apartment address of 67 Bennett Avenue was actually Rod Serling's home address in Binghamton.
 7th Heaven - Binghamton is mentioned by the Reverend when a visitor comes to town. He says "Binghamton… my Binghamton?"
The King of Queens - In the episode "Tube Stakes", Carrie asks Arthur if he remembers a college guy she used to date when she was 16 and Arthur responds, "Oh, yes. Russell from SUNY Binghamton." Victor Williams, who plays Deacon on the show, graduated from Binghamton University in 1992.
Law & Order – Binghamton is mentioned and shown in various episodes of all the Law & Order shows.
Pardon the Interruption – Tony Kornhiser went to Binghamton University and often mentions the school's basketball team.
 A scene in an episode of Seinfeld was shot in Downtown Binghamton (yet to be verified by a credible source).
The pregame fight in Slap Shot is based on a real story that took place on January 16, 1975 in Binghamton, when the Syracuse Blazers and Broome Dusters had a 30-minute pregame brawl.
The music video for Taylor Swift's "Back to December" was filmed in Binghamton.
A large portion of the international web series Pioneer One was filmed in Binghamton.
 Alphas - Numerous episodes reference Binghamton as the place where dangerous Alphas are sent.
 The Office - The episode "Turf War" focuses on the closing of the Binghamton branch of Sabre.  Jim, Andy, and Dwight visit a Binghamton business to woo them as a potential client.
 Family Guy - In the episode "Valentine's Day in Quahog", Peter tells his ex-girlfriend that he will meet her in Binghamton for a Fine Young Cannibals concert.
 Revenge - In the episode "Fear", Conrad mentions sending Victoria to an office in Binghamton to "Christen a landfill".
 What We Do in the Shadows - In the episode "Freddie", Laszlo takes Baby Colin to perform in Binghamton when there's a contract dispute with them and Nadja.

Binghamton in booksA History of the Binghamton Slovaks, by Imrich Mazar: A chronicle of one of Binghamton's largest ethnic populations.From Vision to Excellence: A Popular History of Binghamton University, by Karen T. Hammond: Although Hammond's book focuses on the SUNY campus, it also provides interesting information on the city of Binghamton.Binghamton (Images of America), by Ed Aswad and Suzanne M. Meredith: A photographic history. There are several companion books dealing with IBM, Endicott, Johnson City, and baseball and hockey in Broome County.A Mind of Summer, by Erik Grayson: Includes "Tales of Three Cities", a short oral history of the greater Binghamton area.Diary of a Binghamton boy in the 1860s, by Morris Treadwell: Early Binghamton through the eyes of a young boy.Victorian Pride – Forgotten Songs of Central New York, by Diane Janowski, New York History Review Press: Includes 5 songs written in, or about Binghamton.Partners All: A History of Broome County, New York, by Gerald R. Smith.Working Lives, Broome County, New York, 1800–1930: A Social History of People at Work in Our Region,  by Ross McGuire.Broome County Heritage: An Illustrated History, by Lawrence Bothwell.Broome County: A Contemporary Portrait, by Karen Hammond, Suzanne M. Meredith, Kirk Van Zandbergen, and Leslie Van Zandbergen.Actual Conversations With Myself, by Jeff Orlick: Includes many chapters based in and around the city of Binghamton and Binghamton University.A Picture Post-Card History of New York's Broome County Area — Binghamton, Johnson City, Endicott, Owego, and Surrounding Communities, published by the Kiwanis Club of BinghamtonTastes and Tales of New York's Southern Tier, by Paul VanSavage, Suzanne M. Meredith and Ed Aswad: Profiles of Binghamton area restaurants and other food related businesses.Drunkard's Refuge: The Lessons of the New York State Inebriate Asylum, by John W. Crowley and William L. White: Provides a history of the nation's first mental health facility to treat alcoholism as a disease (located on the grounds of the current Binghamton Psychiatric Center).  The site of the facility is on the National Endangered Properties List.The Fear of Being Found, by Erin Elizabeth Smith: A collection of poems partially set in Binghamton. The Dark Paper Series, by local author Waldo Tomosky: Five anthologies (horror and otherwise).Joe and the Vinegar Pissers, by Waldo Tomosky: Centers on local youth in the 1940s who spend their time terrorizing their parents and the local fire chief.Going with the Pitch: Adjusting to Baseball, School, and Life as a Division I College Athlete, by Ken Jacobi: Focuses on Jacobi's college baseball experience while playing at Binghamton University.The Night Eternal, by Guillermo Del Toro and Chuck Hogan: Several characters stop for gas in Binghamton.

References

External links
 Press & Sun-Bulletin YNN Southern Tier News
 WBNG Action News
 WIVT News Channel 34
 WICZ Fox 40
 Pipe Dream The Greater Binghamton Business Journal The Bridge What's Goin' On Binghamton''

Lists of mass media by city in the United States